The Circle line is a spiral-shaped London Underground line, running from Hammersmith in the west to Edgware Road and then looping around central London back to Edgware Road. The railway is below ground in the central section and on the loop east of Paddington. Unlike London's deep-level lines, the Circle line tunnels are just below the surface and are of similar size to those on British main lines. Printed in yellow on the Tube map, the  line serves 36 stations, including most of London's main line termini. Almost all of the route, and all the stations, are shared with one or more of the three other sub-surface lines, namely the District, Hammersmith & City and Metropolitan lines. On the Circle and Hammersmith & City lines combined, over 114 million passenger journeys were recorded in 2011/12.

The same year a select committee report recommended an "inner circle" of lines connecting the London railway termini, and the Metropolitan District Railway (commonly known as the District Railway) was formed to build the southern portion of the line.

In 1871, services began between Mansion House and Moorgate via Paddington, jointly operated by the two companies. Due to conflict between the two companies it was not until October 1884 that the inner circle was completed. The line was electrified in 1905, and in 1933 the companies were amalgamated into the London Passenger Transport Board. In 1949, the Circle line appeared as a separate line for the first time on the Tube map. In 2009, the closed loop around the centre of London on the north side of the River Thames was broken at Edgware Road and extended west to become a spiral to Hammersmith.

Starting in 2015, the signalling system was upgraded as part of a programme to increase peak-hour capacity on the line. The six-car C Stock trains were replaced from 2012 to 2014 by new seven-car S Stock trains.

History

Origins

In 1863, the Metropolitan Railway, the world's first underground railway, opened in London between Paddington and Farringdon, connecting the Great Western Railway's relatively remote terminus at Paddington with Euston and King's Cross stations and the City, London's financial district. In the same year, a select committee report recommended an "inner circle" of railway lines connecting the London termini that had been built or were under construction. In the next year, the Metropolitan District Railway (commonly known as the District Railway) was formed to build and operate a railway from South Kensington to Tower Hill. The Metropolitan western extension from a new station at Paddington to South Kensington opened in 1868. By May 1870, the District Railway had opened its line from West Brompton to Blackfriars via Gloucester Road and South Kensington, services being operated at first by the Metropolitan. In 1871, the District had built a terminus at Mansion House, and on 18 November 1876 the Metropolitan opened its terminus at Aldgate. Because of the conflict between the two companies, it took an Act of Parliament before further work was done on the inner circle. In 1882, the Metropolitan extended its line from Aldgate to a temporary station at Tower Hill and the District completed its line to Whitechapel. On 6 October 1884, the temporary station was replaced with a joint station and the inner circle was complete. The Metropolitan provided the clockwise, or "outer rail", trains; the District the "inner rail", or anti-clockwise. Many breakdowns occurred, due to the unbalanced wear and tear inflicted upon the train and carriages caused by travelling in a single circular direction. Equally, services were further disrupted due to petty squabbles between the two rivals including an incident whereby the Metropolitan Railway forcibly removed (using three trains) the District Railway's parked carriages which had been chained to the track.

Other circle routes
As well as the inner circle, other routes circumnavigated London, although these were not complete loops. From 1872, the L&NWR began an "outer circle" service from Broad Street to Mansion House via Willesden Junction and Earl's Court, diverting an earlier service that had run to Victoria; and the GWR began a "middle circle" service from Moorgate to Mansion House via Latimer Road and Earl's Court. Both of these routes were cut back to Earl's Court: the "middle circle" in 1900 and the "outer circle" in 1909. The GWR service survived as a shuttle service from the Hammersmith & City line to Addison Road, now Kensington (Olympia), until 1940.

The Midland Railway briefly ran a super outer circle from St Pancras to Earl's Court from 1878 to 1880. London Overground now runs services between Clapham Junction, Willesden Junction and Dalston Junction and between Dalston Junction and Clapham Junction.

Electrification

Wooden carriages were originally hauled by steam locomotives leading to smoke-filled stations and carriages, unpopular with passengers. At the start of the 20th century, the District and Metropolitan were seeing increased competition in central London from the new electric underground tube lines and trams, and conversion to electric traction was seen as the way forward. Experiments were carried out on the Earl's Court to High Street Kensington section, and a jointly-owned six-carriage train began passenger service in 1900. Following this, an AC system was suggested, and this was accepted by both parties. However, the District was looking for a way to raise the finance needed and in 1901 found an investor, the American Charles Yerkes. He formed the Underground Electric Railways of London (UERL), and his experience in the United States led him to favour DC, with third-rail pick-up similar to that in use on the City & South London Railway and Central London Railway. After arbitration by the Board of Trade, the DC system was taken up, and the railways began electrifying the routes, using multiple-unit stock.

The District and Metropolitan Railways bought different designs of electric multiple unit. Both had open saloons; the Metropolitan trains with gated ends, the District B Stock with sliding doors in the middle of each car. When their introduction was attempted on 1 July 1905, a Metropolitan train overturned the third rail on the District Railway, requiring all Metropolitan trains to be modified before running again on the District lines. A fully electric service began on 24 September, initially with six-car trains, later reduced to four-car. The Metropolitan trains were soon modified to enclose the gated end and eventually to add sliding doors in the middle. Trains were increased to five cars in 1918 and the Metropolitan introduced new stock in 1921, with three pairs of sliding double doors on trailer cars. In 1926 the Metropolitan took over all inner circle workings except for three trains on Sundays.

London Transport

On 1 July 1933, the Metropolitan and the District Railways were amalgamated with other Underground railways, tramway companies and bus operators to form the London Passenger Transport Board. Metropolitan Railway electric multiple units were refurbished in 1934 at Acton Works to become eighteen five-car trains of Circle Stock, at first painted red and cream, later painted red all over to reduce costs. These trains included first-class accommodation, but this was downgraded in 1940. From 1947, these were replaced by five-car trains of O and P Stock, with doors remotely operated by the guard, released by the transfer of F Stock to the Uxbridge line. On the 1947 map, the Metropolitan and District lines were shown together in the same colour and two years later in 1949 the Circle line was shown separately on the map.

In 1959–1960, Circle line trains were increased to six cars, the same length as those operating on the Hammersmith & City line, and the stock of the two lines was integrated with maintenance concentrated at Hammersmith depot, allowing Neasden depot to concentrate on the new A Stock. Aluminium C Stock trains, with public address systems and originally unpainted, replaced these trains from 1970. One person operation of the trains was proposed in 1972 but, due to conflict with the trade unions, was not introduced until 1984. In 2003, the infrastructure of the Circle line was partly privatised in a public–private partnership, managed by the Metronet consortium. Metronet went into administration in 2007 and the local government body Transport for London took over responsibilities.

On 7 July 2005, at about 08:50, bombs exploded on two Circle line trains. One was travelling between Liverpool Street and Aldgate and the other was at Edgware Road. The bombs killed 15 people, including the two suicide bombers. Following the attacks, the whole of the Circle line was closed until 8 August.

A day before a ban on drinking alcohol on public transport in London came into force, a party was held on 31 May 2008, mainly on the Circle line. Thousands of people attended and 17 were arrested by police due to disorderly behaviour, eventually causing several stations to be closed.

Extension
In 2006, there were fourteen trains in service on the line with an interval between trains of  minutes during peak hours and 8 minutes off-peak; the minimum running time around the circle off-peak was  minutes, although timetabled stops at stations extended this.

In December 2009, the Circle line was extended to include the Hammersmith & City route from Edgware Road to Hammersmith. Rather than continuously running around the circle, trains now travel from Hammersmith to Edgware Road, generally going around the circle once before terminating at Edgware Road, and returning via the same route; occasionally, trains may also continue clockwise through Edgware Road to additional stations. The change was made to improve reliability and increase the service frequency on the Hammersmith branch.

In March 2020, following the UK government's implementation of lockdown restricting all non-essential travel, the Circle line, along with the Waterloo & City line, was suspended.

Route

Map

Railway line

Almost all of its track, and all of its stations, are shared with the other London Underground sub-surface lines: the Hammersmith & City line from Hammersmith to just north of Aldgate; the Metropolitan line from Baker Street to Aldgate; and the District line from Tower Hill station to Edgware Road station, (except for a short connecting section near Gloucester Road). The running rails are not electrified.

East of Westbourne Park the line passes beneath the Great Western Main Line before resurfacing at Royal Oak station and running alongside the tracks of the main line to an island platform just north of the suburban platforms at Paddington station. The line enters a cut and cover tunnel at the end of the platforms and meets the District line and the other end of the Circle line from Bayswater at Praed Street Junction before passing through Edgware Road station in a cutting. After King's Cross St Pancras station the line exits the tunnel before passing over the Ray Street Gridiron beneath which pass the City Widened Lines which are currently used by Thameslink services. The line continues underground after Farringdon station; there are bay platforms at Moorgate station.

After passing through Aldgate station, the terminus of the Metropolitan line, the line joins the District line shortly before Tower Hill; this part of the line includes stations on the Victoria Embankment, on the north bank of the Thames, as far as Westminster station. West of Gloucester Road station the line turns off the District main line to join the District line's Edgware Road branch just before High Street Kensington station. In Bayswater the line is in a cutting, concealed from above by a façade of two five-storey houses at Nos 23 and 24 Leinster Gardens. Trains then call at the second Paddington station on Praed Street before rejoining the Hammersmith & City line at Praed Street junction and terminating at the four-platform Edgware Road station.

Services
, there are six trains per hour, calling at all stations, requiring 18 trains in service. The journey from Edgware Road around the loop and continuing to Hammersmith takes 72 minutes off-peak. Together with the Hammersmith & City line over 114 million passenger journeys are made each year. Paddington and all stations on the loop are within Zone 1, with those on the line to Hammersmith in Zone 2.

Two trains per day run from the District line station at Barking to Edgware Road via Victoria (as of February 2015).

Announcements 
Historically there has been difficulty in relaying the direction of travel a train is headed in a clear message: variations such as "eastbound" and "westbound", and "clockwise" and "anti-clockwise" can be ambiguous. As passengers became more accustomed to digital devices, TfL considered stopping such announcements and now uses key stations along the route to describe a service (e.g. "via. High Street Kensington").

Rolling stock
From 1970 to 2014, services were provided using six-car C69 stock trains, each car having mostly transverse seating and four sets of double doors per side to minimise loading times.

The C69 stock trains were replaced by seven-car S Stock trains, the first running on the Circle line on 2 September 2013. By June 2014 all services were provided by S7 Stock trains. A 7-car S Stock train has a capacity of 865 passengers compared to 739 for the 6-car C Stock train it replaced.

Depot
The line's depot is at Hammersmith, close to Hammersmith station, originally built by the Great Western Railway to be operated by the Metropolitan Railway when the joint Hammersmith & City Railway was electrified in the early 20th century. Sidings at Barking, Farringdon and near High Street Kensington (known as Triangle Sidings) stable trains overnight.

Four Lines Modernisation (4LM)

It was planned that a new signalling system would be used first on the sub-surface lines from the end of 2016, but signalling contractor Bombardier was released from its contract by agreement in December 2013 amid heavy criticism of the procurement process and London Underground subsequently awarded the contract for the project to Thales in August 2015.

With the introduction of S7 Stock, the track, electrical supply, and signalling systems are being upgraded in a programme planned to increase peak-hour capacity on the line by 27 per cent by the end of 2023. A single control room for the sub-surface railway opened at Hammersmith on 6 May 2018, and Communications Based Control (CBTC) provided by Thales will progressively replace 'fixed block' signalling equipment dating back to the 1940s.

The rollout of CBTC has been split into sections, each known as a Signal Migration Area (SMA), and are located on the line as follows:

List of stations

The line then continues to Edgware Road where trains terminate, then reverse to traverse the loop in an anticlockwise direction to Hammersmith.

Urban myths 
Owing to its traditionally circular nature, the line has generated many urban myths over the years, including a dead man travelling around undiscovered, a school or office using the service to save infrastructure costs and, as an April fool in the Independent, a new particle accelerator to coexist alongside passenger services.

See also

 Cromwell Curve
 Tokyo Toei Oedo Line and Hamburg U3, two underground lines with similar arrangements

Notes and references

Notes

References

Bibliography

Further reading

External links

 Circle Line Clive's UndergrounD Line Guides

London Underground lines
Railway lines opened in 1884
Transport in the City of London
Transport in the City of Westminster
Transport in the Royal Borough of Kensington and Chelsea
Transport in the London Borough of Camden
Transport in the London Borough of Islington
Transport in the London Borough of Tower Hamlets
Railway loop lines
Standard gauge railways in London